The Italian Revolutionary Socialist Party (Partito Socialista Rivoluzionario Italiano, PSRI) was a socialist political party in Italy.

It was founded in 1881 as Revolutionary Socialist Party of Romagna by Andrea Costa, a former anarchist converted to democratic socialism, after his marriage with Anna Kuliscioff. In the 1882 general election Costa was elected to the Italian Chamber of Deputies in Romagna and he later served also as Mayor of Imola. In 1893 the PSRI joined the Socialist Party of Italian Workers, under the leadership of Carlo Dell'Avalle.

References

1881 establishments in Italy
1892 disestablishments in Italy
Defunct political parties in Italy
Defunct socialist parties in Italy
Political parties disestablished in 1892
Political parties established in 1881